Raymond L. Schrock (February 2, 1892 – December 12, 1950) was an American screenwriter. He worked on more than 150 films between 1915 and 1950. He was born in Goshen, Indiana, and died in Hollywood, California, from a heart attack.

Partial filmography

Judy Forgot (1915)
 The Gentle Art of Burglary (1916)
 The Man Inside (1916)
 The Sphinx (1916)
 Never Say Quit (1919)
 Help! Help! Police! (1919)
 The Winning Stroke (1919)
 Burn 'Em Up Barnes (1921)
 The Long Chance (1922)
 I Am the Law (1922)
 A Woman's Woman (1922)
 Confidence (1922)
 Bavu (1923)
 The Clean Up (1923)
 Kindled Courage (1923)
 Little Johnny Jones (1923)
 The Gentleman from America (1923)
 Shootin' for Love (1923)
 McGuire of the Mounted (1923)
 Out of Luck (1923)
 The Acquittal (1923)
 The Thrill Chaser (1923)
 The Darling of New York (1923)
 Hook and Ladder (1924)
 Ride for Your Life (1924)
 Ridgeway of Montana (1924)
 K – The Unknown (1924)
 The Dancing Cheat (1924)
 Jack O'Clubs (1924)
 Wine (1924)
 The Hurricane Kid (1925)
 The Taming of the West (1925)
 The Saddle Hawk (1925)
 The Calgary Stampede (1925)
 The Phantom of the Opera (1925)
 Private Izzy Murphy (1926)
 Burning the Wind (1928)
 The Duke Steps Out (1929)
 Shipmates (1931)
 Hell Below (1933)
 Sitting on the Moon (1936)
 Devil's Island (1939)
 Secret Service of the Air (1939)
 Kid Nightingale (1939)
 The Hidden Hand (1942)
 Wild Bill Hickok Rides (1942)
 Escape from Crime (1942)
 The Last Ride (1944)
 Gas House Kids (1946)
 I Ring Doorbells (1946)
 Daughter of the West (1949)

References

External links

1892 births
1950 deaths
People from Goshen, Indiana
American male screenwriters
Screenwriters from Indiana
20th-century American male writers
20th-century American screenwriters